Clontarf was an electoral district of the Legislative Assembly in the Australian state of Western Australia from 1968 to 1989. It was located in the southern suburbs of Perth on the Canning River, including such suburbs as Wilson, Bentley, Karawara, Rossmoyne and Shelley. It was a marginal seat but with progressive redistributions lost Labor-voting areas to Victoria Park, Canning and Welshpool, and became substantially safer for the Liberal Party.

Members for Clontarf

Election results

Clontarf
1968 establishments in Australia
Constituencies established in 1968
1989 disestablishments in Australia
Constituencies disestablished in 1989